Arcade most often refers to:
 Arcade game, a coin-operated video, pinball, electro-mechanical,  redemption, etc., game
 Arcade video game, a coin-operated video game
 Arcade cabinet, housing which holds an arcade video game's hardware
 Arcade system board, a standardized printed circuit board
 Amusement arcade, a place with arcade games

Architecture
 Arcade (architecture), a series of adjoining arches
 Shopping mall, one or more buildings forming a complex of shops, sometimes called a shopping arcade

Places

Greece
Arcades (Crete), a town and city-state of ancient Crete, Greece

Italy
 Arcade, Italy, a town and commune in the region of Veneto

United States
 Arcade, Georgia, a city in Jackson County
 Arcade, New York, a town in Wyoming County
 Arcade (village), New York, a village in Wyoming County
 Arcade, Texas, an unincorporated community in Ector County
 Arden-Arcade, California, a census-designated place in Sacramento County
 Arcade Building (Asheville, North Carolina)
 The Arcade (Cleveland), a historic building in Ohio
 The Arcade (Oak Bluffs, Massachusetts), a historic site  in Oak Bluffs, Massachusetts
 The Arcade (Providence, Rhode Island), a historic shopping center

Arts and entertainment

Books and comics
 Arcades (Milton), a 1634 masque by John Milton
 Arcade (architecture magazine), quarterly magazine about architecture
 Arcade Publishing, an American publishing company
 Arcade Comics, an independent comic book company founded by Rob Liefeld and Jimmy Jay
 Arcade (Marvel Comics), a supervillain of the Marvel Universe
 Arcade (comics magazine), an underground comics anthology edited by Bill Griffith and Art Spiegelman
 Arcade, video games magazine published by Future Publishing

Film and television
 Arcade (film), a 1993 movie starring Peter Billingsley as a teenage virtual reality addict
 Arcade (TV series) a short-lived Australian soap opera produced in 1980
 Nick Arcade, a game show that aired on the Nickelodeon television channel from 1992 to 1993

Gaming
 Apple Arcade, a video game subscription service by Apple Inc.
 The Arcade (joystick), a popular joystick
 Xbox Live Arcade, a video game download distribution line
 Xbox 360 Arcade, a version of the Xbox 360 home console
 GameSpy Arcade, online gaming through GameSpy Network, similar to Battle.net
 The Arcade (company), workspace in Melbourne, Australia

Music
 Arcade (ballet), by John Taras 1963
 Arcade (band), a rock band formed by ex-Ratt vocalist Stephen Pearcy
 The Arcade (producers), a grammy-nominated music production duo from London
 Arcade Records, a record label

Albums
 Arcade (Arcade album), a 1993 album
 The Arcade (Hyper Crush album), a 2008 album by the band Hyper Crush
 Arcade (John Abercrombie album), a 1979 album by jazz guitarist John Abercrombie
 Arcade (Machinae Supremacy album), a 2002 album by the band Machinae Supremacy

Songs
 "Arcade" (song), a song by Dutch singer Duncan Laurence that won the 2019 Eurovision Song Contest
"Arcades", a song by C2C from Tetra (album)
"Arcades", a song by Hell Is for Heroes from Hell Is for Heroes (album)

Other uses
 Arterial arcades, small intestinal arteries, in anatomy
 ARCADE, Absolute Radiometer for Cosmology, Astrophysics, and Diffuse Emission, a radiometer to explore the cosmos
 Adult video arcade
 Exchange Arcade, the commercial section of the Nottingham Council House
 Shreepati Arcade, one of India's tallest buildings

See also
 Arcadia (disambiguation)